Mala may refer to:

KFH jazeel call center Mala.

Comics

 Mala (Amazon), an Amazon from Wonder Woman's side of the DC Universe
 Mala (Kryptonian), a villain from Superman's corner of the DC Universe

Films and television
 Mala (1941 film), a Bollywood drama film
 , a Yugoslav drama film with Danilo Stojković
 Mala (2013 film), an Argentine crime film

Languages
 Mala language, a Papuan language
 Mala language (Nigeria), a language of Nigeria

Music
 Mala: I Mousiki Tou Anemou, a 2002 Greek soundtrack album by Anna Vissi
 "Mala: I Mousiki Tou Anemou" (song), a song from the album
 Mala (Yolandita Monge album), 2008
 "Mala" (song), a song from the album
 Mala (Devendra Banhart album), an album by folk-rock musician Devendra Banhart
 "Mala" (6ix9ine song), a Spanish song by American rapper 6ix9ine
 Mala Records, a record label

People

Given name
 Mala (Pakistani singer) (1939–1990), Pakistani playback singer of Urdu and Punjabi films
 Mala Aravindan (1939–2015), Malayalam film actor
 Mala Gaonkar (born 1969), American businessperson
 Mala Kachalla (1941–2007), former governor of Borno State in Nigeria
 Mala Powers (1931–2007), American actress
 Mala Rodríguez, also known as La Mala, La Mala María, Spanish hip hop rapper
 Mala Roy, Indian politician
 Mala Sinha (born 1936), Indian actress
 Mala Zimetbaum (1922–1944), Belgian woman of Polish Jewish descent executed for escaping from the Auschwitz-Birkenau concentration camp

Nickname
 Malá (footballer) (born 1979), Bissau-Guinean football midfielder
 Mala (musician), a member of Deep Dub duo Digital Mystikz

Surname
Doueugui Mala (born 1993), Ivorian footballer
Esat Mala (born 1998), Albanian footballer 
Ray Mala (1906–1952), Native American movie actor
Shormi Mala, Bangladeshi stage, television and film actress
Zef Mala (1915–1979), Albanian publicist and communist activist

Places
 Mała, a village in Poland
 Mäla, a village in western Estonia
 Mala, Homalin, a village in Burma
 Mala, Lanzarote, a village in the Canary Islands
 Mala, Kerala, a village in southern India
 Mala, Nepal, a village and village development committee
 Mala, Sweden, a village
 Mala District, Peru
 Mala, Cañete Province, capital of the district
 Malå Municipality, in northern Sweden
 Mala, a village in Jaghori District, Ghazni, Afghanistan
 Malaita or Mala, an island of the Solomon Islands

Other uses
 Chera dynasty or Mala, South India
 Cyclone Mala, a cyclonic storm that killed 22 people in Burma in 2006
 Japamala, also known as mala, a loop of prayer beads commonly used in several Indian religions
 Mala (caste) or Mala community, from Andhra Pradesh
 Mala (river), a small tributary of the Danube in Romania
 Mala (seasoning) (麻辣, or málà), a numbing and spicy Chinese seasoning made from chillies and Sichuan pepper
 Malå IF, Swedish football club located in Malå in Västerbotten County
 Mala story, an Aboriginal Dreamtime story of central Australia
 Metropolis-adjusted Langevin algorithm (MALA), a Markov chain Monte Carlo method
 Rufous hare-wallaby or mala, a small wallaby native to Australia

See also
 Mala Mala (disambiguation)
 Malla (disambiguation)
 Malaa, Bangladeshi-Australian singer